Sai Buri is a district (amphoe) in Pattani province, southern Thailand.

The local Malay people call it Teluban (Jawi: تلوبن), which is also the name of the only municipal area of the district, or Selindung Bayu (Jawi: سليندوڠ بايو), the Malay and Sanskrit word for 'wind shelter'.

Geography
Neighboring districts are (from the southeast clockwise): Mai Kaen of Pattani Province; Bacho of Narathiwat province; Kapho, Thung Yang Daeng, and Panare of Pattani. To the east is the Gulf of Thailand.

History

Sai Buri was one of the seven mueangs into which the Pattani sultanate was split. In the thesaphiban administrative reforms at the beginning of the 20th century it became a province within the Monthon Pattani. In 1909 the area of the province was reduced by reassigning Yi-Ngo and modern-day Mueang Narathiwat Districts to Mueang Bang Nara, now Narathiwat Province. In 1932 the province was abolished, the northern half was added to Pattani Province and the southern part to Narathiwat.

Originally simply named "Mueang", the district was renamed "Taluban" in 1917. In 1938 the district was renamed "Sai Buri".

Administration
The district is divided into 11 sub-districts (tambons), which are further subdivided into 64 villages (mubans). Taluban is a sub-district municipality (thesaban tambon), which encompasses tambon Taluban. Each of the other sub-districts has a tambon administrative organization (TAO).

References

External links 
amphoe.com (in Thai)

Districts of Pattani province

Former provinces of Thailand